Huliyurdurga  is a village in the southern state of Karnataka, India. It is located in the Kunigal taluk of Tumkur district in Karnataka.

Demographics
As of 2011 India census, Huliyurdurga had a population of 7989 with 4034 males and 3955 females.

Geography
Huliyurdurga is about 60 km south of Tumkur town and about 22 km south of Kunigal, 30 km of Ramanagara. It is now the headquarters of the hobli of the same name was once the headquarters of the taluk of the same name till 1873. It is situated on the foot of the hill of the same name. The hill is a solid mass of rock and has the peculiar appearance of an inverted cup. 

The fortification of the hill commanding the place is about 845 metres above the sea level and were said to have been erected by Kempe Gowda, the Magadi chief. There are springs, ruined houses, powder magazines granaries, durbar hall and other remains of the fort. 

A temple close to this hill is said to have been built by Kempe Gowda or by Chikkadeveraya Wodeyar. It has well worked granite pillars in the navaranga. The temple of Mallikarjuna is situated on the summit of Hemagiri hill which is by the side of Huliyurdurga. A shrine of Varadaraja, locally known as Hemagiriyappa, is on the eastern slope of Hemagiri where the object of worship is a round stone and on the southern slope is a shrine of Bhairava. The hill is loftier than Huliyurdurga but not fortified.

Gallery

See also
 Tumkur
 Districts of Karnataka

References

3.Karnataka State Gazetteer 1983.

External links

 http://Tumkur.nic.in/

Villages in Tumkur district
Forts in Karnataka
Buildings and structures in Tumkur district
Hills of Karnataka